MV Shelly was a  cargo ship that was built in Bulgaria in 1973. She sank off the Mediterranean coast of Israel in 2007 after the  cruise ship  rammed her and broke her in two. Two of Shellys crew were killed.

Ship
The Ivan Dimitrov shipyard on the River Danube in Ruse, Bulgaria built the ship and launched her in 1973 as Zlatograd. She changed hands in 1999 and was renamed Loti. She changed hands again in 2002 and was renamed Dora. In 2003 Israeli owners bought her, renamed her Shelly and registered her in Slovakia. She was crewed not by Israelis but by other nationalities, mainly Slovaks and Ukrainians.

Collision and sinking
Shelly sank quickly after the collision, which the Israel Broadcasting Authority said broke her in half. 11 crew members escaped, and most climbed aboard a rescue launch lowered by Salamis Glory and were subsequently rescued by the Israeli Navy. The rest were rescued by helicopter. The survivors refused to be taken to a local hospital for treatment. Salamis Glory subsequently returned to port in Haifa, showing slight damage to her hull. None of Salamis Glorys 700 or so passengers and crew was injured.

The dead were identified as the ship's Indonesian First Mate and Ukrainian engineer.

The vessel's sinking released an oil spill that moved down the coast, causing authorities to warn the public not to bathe at the nearby Zevulun beach.

On 31 August Salamis Lines, owners of Salamis Glory, arranged for 148 stranded Cypriot passengers from the ship to be flown back to Cyprus on a Cyprus Airways jet.

Investigation
Israeli Police launched a full investigation into the cause of the accident, aided by Cypriot authorities. All of Salamis Glorys crew were interviewed. One possibility being considered was that there was a fault in the ship's navigation system, with some reports of a loss of steering control aboard Salamis Glory.

References

2007 in Israel
Maritime incidents in 2007
Maritime incidents in Israel
Oil spills in Asia
Ships of Bulgaria
Ships of Israel
Ships of Slovakia
Ships sunk in collisions
Shipwrecks in the Mediterranean Sea
Ships built in Bulgaria
Oil spills in international waters
2007 disasters in Israel